The Jardim Oceânico / Barra da Tijuca Station is a station on the Rio de Janeiro Metro. The station forms the terminus of Line 4 and then connects it to the bus station Terminal Alvorada in Barra da Tijuca by an extension of TransOeste.

References

Metrô Rio stations
Railway stations opened in 2016